Christina Dragan (born 19 April 2007) is a Romanian-American rhythmic gymnast.

Personal life 
She took the sport following her sister Annaliese's footsteps, in 2019 the sisters were invited by the Romanian federation to compete for them, thanks to their parents' nationality. They represented Romania together at the 2020 European Championship.

Career

Junior 
Her debut for Romania was the 2020 Irina Deleanu's cup where the two sisters were 4th in the team competition, Christina ended 4th with rope, 11th with ball, 6th with clubs and 4th with ribbon.  In October she beat her sister to become the national champion in the junior category, and won silver at the Romanian Cup a few weeks later. Her major international competition was the 2020 European Championship in Kyiv, Ukraine. She ended up 10th in the All-Around just behind her sister and was the first reserve for the ball final.

In 2021 she maintained her national title and won some medals in international tournaments.

In 2022 she joined her sister at the European Championship once again, even though Annaliese competed in the senior category. Dragan performed with hoop and ball qualifying for both event finals and getting the second highest hoop score (30.95), at the end of the first day Christina and her teammate Amalia Lică won silver, only the second medals for Romania in a junior European Championship, in the team event behind Israel and above Bulgaria. The next day Dragan also won bronze in the ball final.

Routine music information 

"9. European Junior Championships in Bucharest, Romania (20.-23. May 1993)"

References

External links
 

Living people
2007 births
Romanian rhythmic gymnasts